Imperial and Royal Uhlan Regiment "Prince of Schwarzenberg" No. 2. was a regiment in the army of the Austro-Hungarian Empire.

The regiment could trace its antecedence to 1790 and the formation of the Ulanen Free Corps (Ulanen-Frei-Korp) for the Imperial Habsburg Army. From this beginning it was a regiment in the army of the Imperial and Royal (kaiserlich und königlich (k.u.k.)) Austrian Empire during the first half of the 19th century, and hence a regiment in the Austro-Hungarian Empire up until its dissolution at the end of the First World War.
 
Up until 1798, regiments were named after the regiment owner (who did not also have to be the commander). A binding regulation of the spelling did not exist (e.g. Regiment Graf Serbelloni – or Regiment Serbelloni). With each change of ownership, the affected regiment also changed its name. After the system was changed in 1798, the numbered designation, which could sometimes be combined with the name of the owner, prevailed

In 1800 the regiment was given the name of Prince Schwarzenberg and this was expected to last indefinitely. Nevertheless, the honorary names of the regiments were deleted in 1915 without replacement. From then on, the regiment was only called "Imperial and Royal Uhlan Regiment No. 2" (However, this did not catch on, in particular the very thrifty Imperial and Royal military administration had ordered that all existing letterhead and stamps be used up first).

As a reward for the merits acquired by the regiment in the earlier campaigns, the officers wore the curb chain on the czapka (cap) instead of gold-plated metal, as in the other Uhlan regiments, made of silver. The regiment celebrated its feast day on 21 May, on the anniversary of the Battle of Aspern in 1809.

Notes

References

 

History of Austria-Hungary
Austro-Hungarian Army